Kyle Schneider (born 7 February 2000) is a Scotland international rugby league footballer who plays as a  for the Mackay Cutters in the Queensland Cup.

Background
Schneider was born in Kanwal, New South Wales, Australia. He is of Scottish descent.

Schneider played his junior rugby league with Parramatta and captained the SG Ball and Harold Matthews sides as they won both competitions. Schneider also captained the New South Wales Under 16's side in 2016.
In 2017, Schneider was selected to represent the New South Wales Under 18's side.
On 12 October 2020, Schneider was released by Parramatta.

Playing career

Club career
Schneider played in 18 games, and scored 4 goals for the Mackay Cutters in the 2022 Queensland Cup. In December 2022, it was announced that Schneider had signed a train and trial contract with North Queensland ahead of the 2023 NRL season.

International career
In 2022 Schneider was named in the Scotland squad for the 2021 Rugby League World Cup.
Schneider played all three games for Scotland at the 2021 Rugby League World Cup as they finished winless losing all three matches.

References

External links
Mackay Cutters profile
Scotland profile
Scotland RL profile

2000 births
Living people
Australian rugby league players
Australian people of Scottish descent
Mackay Cutters players
Rugby league hookers
Rugby league players from New South Wales
Scotland national rugby league team players